This is a list of Azerbaijani women artists who were born in Azerbaijan or whose artworks are closely associated with that country.

A
Hayat Abdullayeva (1912–2006), sculptor
Sara Ashurbeyli (1907–2006), painter

E
Rena Effendi (born 1977), Cairo-based Azerbaijani photographer

H
Elmira Hüseynova (1933–1995), sculptor, portraitist

K
Geysar Kashiyeva (1893–1972), Georgian-Azerbaijiani painter

M
Aida Mahmudova (born 1982), contemporary artist
Zivar Mammadova (1902–1980), sculptor
 Gunay Mehdizade (born 1981), painter
Gullu Mustafayeva (1919–1994), painter

R
Maral Rahmanzadeh (1916–2008), painter
 Munavvar Rzayeva (1929–2004), sculptor

S
Khalida Safarova (1926–2005), painter
 Vajiha Samadova (1924–1965), painter
 Elmira Shahtakhtinskaya (1930–1996), painter
Sabina Shikhlinskaya (born 1962), contemporary artist

T 

 Reyhan Topchubashova (1905–1970), painter

See also 
 List of Azerbaijani artists

-
Azerbaijani women artists, List of
Artists
Artists